The MAAC women's basketball tournament determines the Metro Atlantic Athletic Conference's champion and the winner of the conference's automatic bid to the NCAA Division I women's basketball tournament.

Seeding
Seeds in the MAAC tournament are linked to teams' conference records.  Non-conference games are not a factor.  The team with the overall best record in the conference is seeded "1", the next best conference record "2", and so on.

Starting with the 2014 tournament, teams seeded from 1 to 6 receive a bye in the first round.

Tournament champions by year

Champions

 † No longer a member of the MAAC

See also
 MAAC men's basketball tournament

References

 
Recurring sporting events established in 1982